The seventy-first Minnesota Legislature first convened on January 3, 1979. The 67 members of the Minnesota Senate were elected during the General Election of November 2, 1976, and the 134 members of the Minnesota House of Representatives were elected during the General Election of November 7, 1978.

The seventy-first legislature is noteworthy for the partisan composition of the House of Representatives. Until Bob Pavlak was unseated for unfair campaign practices, the House was equally divided between the DFL and the Independent-Republicans. Due to the tie, the DFL and the Independent-Republicans were forced to forge a compromise by which the Independent-Republicans were to elect the Speaker from among their own ranks, while the DFL would be given the chairmanship of, and one-vote majorities on, the rules and tax committees. This agreement was superseded for the 1980 continuation of the regular session, by which time the DFL had gained a slim majority in the House.

Sessions 
The legislature met in a regular session from January 3, 1979 to May 24, 1979. A special session was convened on May 24, 1979 to consider three bills regarding workers' compensation, energy, and transportation appropriations.

A continuation of the regular session was held between January 22, 1980 and April 12, 1980. No special sessions were held in 1980. The legislature met for a total of 99 legislative days during the 1979-80 biennium.

Party summary 
Resignations and new members are discussed in the "Membership changes" section, below.

Senate

House of Representatives

Leadership

Senate 
President of the Senate
Edward J. Gearty (DFL-Minneapolis)

Senate Majority Leader
Nick Coleman (DFL-St. Paul)

Senate Minority Leader
Robert O. Ashbach (IR-St. Paul)

House of Representatives 
Speaker of the House
1979: Rod Searle (IR-Waseca)
1980: Fred C. Norton (DFL-St. Paul)

House Majority Leader
1979: Irv Anderson (DFL-International Falls) and Jerry Knickerbocker (IR-Minnetonka)
1980: Irv Anderson (DFL-International Falls)

House Minority Leader
1979: None
1980: Rod Searle (IR-Waseca)

Members

Senate

House of Representatives

Membership changes

Senate

House of Representatives

Notes

References 

 Minnesota Legislators Past & Present - Session Search Results (Session 71, Senate)
 Minnesota Legislators Past & Present - Session Search Results (Session 71, House)

71st
1970s in Minnesota
1980s in Minnesota
1979 in Minnesota
1980 in Minnesota
1979 U.S. legislative sessions
1980 U.S. legislative sessions